"Comin' Home" is a song by American rock band Hum. The song was released as the lead single from the band's fourth studio album Downward Is Heavenward.

Overview
"Comin' Home" entered the Billboard Modern Rock Tracks chart on February 14, 1998 at #39. The next week, the song reached its peak position on the chart at #37. Along with "Stars," "Comin' Home" is one of Hum's most popular songs.

Track listing
7" single

US and Canada CD single

Australia CD single

Chart performance

References

External links
 Official Music Video on YouTube

Hum (band) songs
1998 songs
1998 singles
RCA Records singles